This article lists the results for the sport of Squash in 2015.

International squash events
 March 28 – April 5: 2015 European Junior Squash Championships (U19) in  Prague
 Men's winner:  George Parker
 Women's winner:  Georgina Kennedy
 Team winners: 
 May 14 – 17: 2015 European Junior U15 & U17 Team Championships in  Lisbon
 U15 and U17 team winners: 
 May 27 – 30: 2015 European Squash Individual Championships in  Bratislava
 Men:  Grégory Gaultier defeated  Borja Golán 11–3, 5–11, 11–7, 11–5, to win his third consecutive and his ninth overall European Squash Individual Championships title.  Raphael Kandra took third place.
 Women:  Camille Serme defeated  Line Hansen 12–10, 11–6, 11–6, to win her fourth consecutive European Squash Individual Championships title.  Coline Aumard took third place.
 July 31 – August 4: 2015 Women's World Junior Team Squash Championships in  Cairo
 August 27 – 30: 2015 European Masters Individual Championships in  Malmö
 For results, click here.
 September 16 – 19: 2015 European Club Championships in  Kraków
 Men: Team  Black & White Worms defeated fellow German club, Paderborner, 7–6 in games countback and after a 2–2 score in regular play, in the final. Team  Mulhouse took third place.
 Women: Team  US Créteil defeated fellow French club, Mulhouse, 3–1 in matches played, in the final. Team  Paderborner took third place. 
 December 12 – 18: 2015 Men's World Team Squash Championships in  Cairo
 Event postponed, due to national security concerns.

2015 PSA World Series

Men
 January 16 – 23: Tournament of Champions 2015 in  New York City
  Mohamed El Shorbagy defeated  Nick Matthew 5–11, 11–9, 11–8, 12–10, to win his first Tournament of Champions title.
 February 26 – March 4: Windy City Open 2015 in  Chicago
  Nick Matthew defeated  Mohamed El Shorbagy 11–7, 11–2, 11–7, to win his second Windy City Open title.
 April 5 – 10: El Gouna International 2015 in 
  Ramy Ashour defeated fellow Egyptian, Mohamed El Shorbagy, 11–9, 11–6, 4–11, 10–12, 12–10, to win his third El Gouna International title.
 May 13 – 17: 2015 Men's British Open in  Kingston upon Hull
  Mohamed El Shorbagy defeated  Grégory Gaultier 11–9, 6–11, 5–11, 11–8, 11–5, to win his first Men's British Open title. 
 October 10 – 17: US Open 2015 in  Philadelphia
  Grégory Gaultier defeated  Omar Mosaad 11–6, 11–3, 11–5, to win his third US Open title.
 October 31 – November 6: Men's Qatar Classic 2015 in  Doha
  Mohamed El Shorbagy defeated  Grégory Gaultier 11–5, 11–7, 5–11, 12–10, to win his second Men's Qatar Classic title.
 December 1 – 6: Hong Kong Open in 
  Mohamed El Shorbagy defeated  Cameron Pilley 11–8, 11–6, 11–8, to win his second consecutive Hong Kong Open title.

Women
 February 26 – March 4: Women's Windy City Open 2015 in  Chicago
  Raneem El Weleily defeated  Nicol David 14–16, 12–10, 11–7, 11–7, to win her first Women's Windy City Open title.
 May 10 – 17: 2015 Women's British Open Squash Championship in  Kingston upon Hull
  Camille Serme defeated  Laura Massaro 11–3, 11–5, 8–11, 11–8, to win her first Women's British Open Squash Championship title.
 October 10 – 17: Women's United States Open (squash) 2015 in  Philadelphia
  Laura Massaro defeated  Nour El Tayeb 11–6, 9–11, 6–11, 11–8, 11–7, to win her second Women's United States Open title.
 October 31 – November 6: Women's Qatar Classic 2015 in  Doha
  Laura Massaro defeated  Nour El Sherbini 11–8, 12–14, 11–9, 8–11, 11–9, to win her first Women's Qatar Classic title. 
 December 1 – 6: Women's Hong Kong squash Open 2015 in 
  Nicol David defeated  Laura Massaro 15–13, 11–9, 11–3, to win her tenth consecutive Women's Hong Kong Squash Open title. 
 December 11 – 18: 2015 Women's World Open Squash Championship in  Kuala Lumpur
 Event cancelled, due to conflicting allegations of internal blackmailing between organizers and the federal government.

References

External links
 World Squash: official website of the World Squash Federation

 
Squash by year